General Welch may refer to:

Larry D. Welch (born 1934), U.S. Air Force four-star general
Nick Welch (British Army officer) (born c. 1964), British Army major general
Ron Welch (born 1960), U.S. Army brigadier general
William H. Welch (1850–1934), U.S. Army brigadier general

See also
General Welsh (disambiguation)